Rogelio Salcedo (15 April 1925 – 23 January 1955) was a Chilean cyclist. He competed in the individual and team road race events at the 1948 Summer Olympics.

References

External links
 

1925 births
1955 deaths
Chilean male cyclists
Olympic cyclists of Chile
Cyclists at the 1948 Summer Olympics
People from San Antonio, Chile
20th-century Chilean people